Vilkhivka is a village in the Kharkiv Raion, Kharkiv Oblast (province) of eastern Ukraine. It is the administrative centre of Vilkhivka rural hromada, one of the hromadas of Ukraine.

History
During the 2022 Russian invasion of Ukraine, Vilkhivka was conquered by the Russian invaders, but was liberated on 27 March by the Ukrainian Army.

References

Villages in Kharkiv Raion